Empress Xiaoduanxian (7 November 1564 – 7 May 1620), personal name Wang Xijie, was empress consort of the Wanli Emperor. She was the longest serving empress consort in Chinese history.

Early life
Wang was born in Beijing to Wang Wei (王偉) of Yuyao, Zhejiang.

In the first month of 1577, Empress Dowager Rensheng and Empress Dowager Xiaoding held a selection event to choose an empress for the Wanli Emperor. The 12-year old Wang Xijie entered the selection process and was successfully chosen to be the empress. In the first month of 1578, she was formally married to the Wanli Emperor at the age of 13. The grand secretary Zhang Juzheng wrote to both empress dowagers, arguing that Wang Xijie and the Wanli Emperor were too young.

Initially, Wang's father was made a member of the Jinyiwei with authority over 1,000 households as a result of his daughter's success. In 1579, the Wanli Emperor also conferred the rank of Count (伯) of Yongnian on him. Since the time of the Jiajing Emperor, inheritance of a feudal title by lineal descendants was not permitted. To show favour to Wang Xijie, her brother Wang Dong (王棟) was granted the countship on their father's death. When Wang Dong died, his mother Lady Zhao (趙) begged the emperor to extend the countship to Wang Dong's children, which was promptly done. Only the family of Empress Dowager Xiaoding had previously received similar honours.

Empress
The History of Ming records that the empress was extremely solemn and her filial piety made her a favourite of her mother-in-law Empress Dowager Xiaoding.
During the period when the succession was undecided, the emperor's eldest son by Lady Gong was attacked at his palace in the east of the imperial city. Empress Xiaoduanxian organised for more guards and protections to be installed at his residence.

The historian Ray Huang comments: 
"She was, from her wedding day, permanently encased in palatial pomp and comfort; yet, by cruel exigency of tradition, her marriage was only a state necessity, reducing her to an accessory to an institution, entitled to all kind of meaningless honors but to little satisfaction as a wife. She bore the emperor a daughter and lived almost as long as he did. But at no time did she in any way affect the course of his life. As the principal daughter-in-law to jen-sheng, the emperor's principal mother, she had both the privilege and the obligation of attending her in public, such as helping her from her sedan chair, a task Hsiao-tuan performed exactly as required, thus earning for herself a reputation for filial piety. Inside the palace, however, she was better remembered as a ruthless mistress who frequently ordered her chambermaids beaten, sometimes to death."

Empress Xiaoduanxian had one daughter in 1582 named Zhu Xuanying, formally titled the Princess Rongchang, who married a military commander named Yang Chunyuan (楊春元).

Titles
During the reign of the Jiajing Emperor (r. 1521–1567):
Lady Wang (王氏; from 7 November 1564)
During the reign of the Wanli Emperor (r. 1572–1620):
Empress (皇后; from 1578)
Empress Xiàoduān Zhēnkè Zhuānghuì Rénmíng Pìtiān Yùshèng Xiǎn (孝端贞恪庄惠仁明媲天毓圣显皇后; from 1620)

Issue 
As empress:
Princess Rongchang (榮昌公主; 1582–1647), personal name Xuanying (軒媖), the Wanli Emperor first daughter
Married Yang Chunyuan (1582–1616) in 1597, and had issue (five sons)

Tomb

The empress was buried at Dingling, where her husband was later interred.

During the excavation of Dingling in 1956, many treasures from Empress Xiaoduanxian's burial were unearthed. These included her phoenix crown, which the empress would have worn when visiting and making sacrifices in the ancestral temple. The crown features three phoenixes, six dragons, and weighs 2.96 kg. It now forms part of the collections of the National Museum of China.

Gallery

Notes

Sources 

1560s births
1620 deaths
Ming dynasty empresses
People from Ningbo
16th-century Chinese women
16th-century Chinese people
17th-century Chinese women
17th-century Chinese people